André Cheuva (30 May 1908 – 5 February 1989) was a French footballer who played midfielder. After retiring, he became a manager, and won 4 Coupe de France with Lille O.S.C.

References

External links
 
 
 Profile on French federation official site

1908 births
1989 deaths
French footballers
France international footballers
Association football midfielders
Ligue 1 players
French football managers
Lille OSC managers
US Boulogne managers
SC Fives players
Olympique Lillois players